Bismarckia is a monotypic genus of flowering plant in the palm family endemic to western and northern Madagascar where they grow in open grassland. The genus is named for the first chancellor of the German Empire Otto von Bismarck and the epithet for its only species, Bismarckia nobilis, comes from Latin for 'noble'.

Description

Bismarckia nobilis grows from solitary trunks, gray to tan in color, which show ringed indentations from old leaf bases.  Trunks are 30 to 45 cm in diameter, slightly bulging at the base, and free of leaf bases in all but its youngest parts.  In their natural habitat they can reach above 25 meters in height but usually get no taller than 12 m in cultivation.  The nearly rounded leaves are enormous in maturity, over 3 m wide, and are divided to a third its length into 20 or more stiff, once-folded segments, themselves split on the ends.  The leaves are induplicate and costapalmate, producing a wedge-shaped hastula where the blade and petiole meet.  Petioles are 2–3 m, slightly armed, and are covered in a white wax as well as cinnamon-colored caducous scales; the nearly-spherical leaf crown is 7.5 m wide and 6 m tall.  Most cultivated Bismarckias  feature silver-blue foliage although a green leaf variety exists (which is less hardy to cold).  These palms are dioecious and produce pendent, interfoliar inflorescences of small brown flowers which, in female plants, mature to a brown ovoid drupe, each containing a single seed.

Distribution and habitat
Native to Madagascar, an island well known for its rich diversity of unique taxa, Bismarckia is one genus among a diverse palm flora (some 170 palms of which 165 are solely in Madagascar).  They grow in the plains of the central highlands, nearly reaching the western and northern coasts, in savannas of low grass, usually in lateritic soil.  As much of this land has been cleared with fire for agricultural use, Bismarckias, along with other fire-resistant trees like Ravenala madagascariensis and Uapaca bojeri, are the most conspicuous components of this arid region.

Cultivation
Bismarck palms are grown throughout the tropics and subtropics under favorable microclimates. They are grown in many parts of Indonesia and Australia. In the United States, they are planted in several areas of Florida, a few areas of Southern California, southern and southeastern Texas, and southern Arizona. Bismarck palms will suffer from cold damage but they quickly recover. The green variety is more cold sensitive than is the silver-gray variety. While Bismarckia tolerate some drought, they thrive in areas with adequate rainfall. Because of their massive crowns, they need plenty of room in a landscape area.

Bismarck palm tree care and maintenance

Bismarck palms are easy to grow in the right environment as they are adaptable to a wide range of soils and prefer to have good drainage as the Bismarck does not like to have root rot. The Bismarck palm can adapt to either acidic or alkaline soil and prefers to be watered directly into the root system or sprayed through the palm heart. When planting the Bismarck palm make sure to not to cover up any part of the trunk, as this will lead to problems as the Bismarck palm is susceptible to be eaten by microorganisms that live naturally in soil and other mediums.

References

External links

Floridata site
Bismarckia pictures
PACSOA link
USDA site

Coryphoideae
Monotypic Arecaceae genera
Endemic flora of Madagascar
Trees of Madagascar
Garden plants of Africa
Ornamental trees
Dioecious plants
Flora of the Madagascar dry deciduous forests